(born 1961) is a Japanese illustrator most famous for doing the cover artwork for the Romance of the Three Kingdoms (video game series) games by Koei since the 1980s. His art style is realism and surrealism.
He also does Star Wars artwork and illustrations in Japan.

References
 Official page at Japanese Professional Illustrators website

Living people
Japanese illustrators
Video game artists
1961 births